The Detroit Partnership (also known as the Detroit crime family, Detroit Combination, Detroit Mafia, Zerilli crime family, and the Tocco–Zerilli crime family) is an Italian-American organized crime syndicate based in Detroit, Michigan, and mainly operates in the Greater Detroit area as part of the larger Italian-American Mafia. They hold interests in Windsor, Ontario, Toledo, Ohio; as well as other cities in Michigan, Ohio, West Virginia, Nevada, and Sicily.

History

Early years
Three brothers originally from Terrasini, Gaetano Gianola, Antonio "Tony" and Salvatore "Sam", were grocers and fruit peddlers. They first came to the attention of authorities in late 1911 when their grocery store was raided and police confiscated $2,000 worth of stolen olive oil. Weeks later the mutilated corpse of a former Gianola associate, Sam Beundo, was found charred and left in a field. Beundo had allegedly tipped off law enforcement to stolen merchandise found in the basement of the Gianola store. The murder of Beundo established the Gianola brothers as a feared force within the Italian underworld.

The Gianola–Adamo war (1912–1913)

Between 1912 and 1913, the Gianola brothers took over the Wyandotte area rackets gang starting a feud with Wyandotte Mafia boss Vito Adamo. The brothers felt they had secured victory after a series of attacks on the Adamo gang, which left several members dead. Adamo moved to Detroit and aligned himself with Mafia leader Pietro Mirabile, while the Gianolas sought to take over the illicit beer trade. The Adamos were able to fend off the Gianolas' first attempts by giving away free ice with their deliveries. The Adamo gang killed two Gianola gang members, William Catalano and John Jervaso, in April 1913. A string of killings and arrests on both sides followed.

Adamo and two associates were put on trial for the August 1913 murder of Tony Gianola's top aide Carlo Callego. Shortly thereafter an attempt was made on the life of Tony Gianola. In the latter part of 1913, the Gianolas struck indirectly at the Adamos with the elimination of their associate and adviser, Ferdinand Palma, a former Detroit detective turned bank owner and racketeer. In November 1913, both Vito, 34 and Sam Adamo, 32, were gunned down by shooters near their home.

The Gianola gang then became the dominant Italian crime group in Detroit. They controlled the most lucrative rackets within Detroit's Italian underworld. Top members of the gang who would go on to lead the Detroit Mafia and rule the local underworld included John Vitale, Salvatore Catalanotte, Angelo Meli, William Tocco, Joseph Zerilli, Leonardo "Black Leo" Cellura, and Angelo Polizzi. Tony Gianola remained the leader of the gang running operations from the base in Wyandotte. His younger brother Sam secured a reputation as a tough enforcer who led a group of killers, and Gaetano remained the adviser of the group.

The Gianola–Vitale war (1918–1919)
The Gianola brothers had aligned themselves with mobster John Vitale, who had entered the liquor business with associates Sam Cipriano, Peter Bosco and Joseph Stefano. The Gianola-Vitale alliance and their "liquor combine" were the main competitors to the Adamo brothers. While the Gianolas had fought directly with the Adamos, Vitale and his associates had continued to run the affairs of their liquor business. With the elimination of the Adamo brothers, the Gianola gang's ascension gave Vitale the opportunity to expand his liquor business. Vitale became one of the gang's most trusted and influential lieutenants, along with Cipriano and Bosco. This relationship continued until Bosco was murdered on the orders of Tony Gianola after a disagreement over proceeds from their bakery business. Animosities over the Bosco killing grew and eventually conflict arose between the Gianola brothers and Vitale.

In late 1918, Vitale broke away from the Gianola gang and established himself independently, aligning himself with the remnants of the Bosco group. What became known as the "Gianola-Vitale War" emerged as one of the bloodiest battles in the history of the Detroit Mafia. It left many dead on both sides as they vied for absolute control over Detroit's Italian underworld. Several of Detroit's future Mafia leaders became top Gianola gunmen during this time, including Giuseppe Manzello, Angelo Meli, Bill Tocco, Joe Zerilli, Leo Cellura and Angelo Polizzi.

The Vitale gang struck the first major blow to their rivals when Tony Gianola was murdered in January 1919. His brother Sam took over as the new leader of the gang. The Vitale gang made an attempt on his life in February 1919. Sam escaped unharmed, but his brother-in-law Pasquale D'Anna was killed. Sam Gianola ordered a surprise attack on the Vitale forces in retaliation. He ordered his gunmen to shower the Vitale headquarters with bullets precisely when D'Anna was being laid to rest during his funeral. No one was killed, but Vitale mistakenly shot and wounded one of the police officers who responded to the shooting and was arrested.

Three weeks later, Sam Gianola was arraigned on auto theft charges. The next day, he led a team of shooters into the Wayne County jail house in response to the killings of Tony and Pasqaule, opening fire on three Vitale gang members. Joe Vitale and Salvatore Evola were each shot once and survived. Vito Renda was hit 21 times but lived just long enough to break the Mafia code of Omertà and reveal to authorities that Sam Gianola was one of the shooters. Gianola was arrested and charged with Renda's murder. During the murder trial months later, it took the jury 50 minutes to find him not guilty.

Two of Sam Gianola's sons died in a house fire in July 1919, and later that summer a sit-down was called so that representatives of the two factions, could seek a peaceful solution. Detroit underworld legend claims that an agreeable arrangement was achieved and that a "peace pact" was drawn and written in blood by the two feuding Mafia chieftains. Some understanding was reached regarding the liquor rackets and the other criminal activities. However, with the passing of the Volstead Act in October 1919, new motivation for the mobsters presented itself.

With the advent of Prohibition, tens of millions of dollars in illicit profits were at stake in control of the new liquor import and bootlegging trade. In early October 1919, weeks before the passing of the Volstead Act, Sam Gianola was hit by a barrage of bullets originating from a car parked in front of a bank. Gianola was hit 28 times, staggered back into the bank, collapsed and died. John Vitale, the prime suspect in the murder, was meeting with his attorney at the time of the incident discussing the strategy for his upcoming trial.

With the death of Gianola, his gang split into two independent factions, both still opposed to John Vitale.

John Vitale's reign
At the start of 1920, Vitale had emerged as the top Mafia boss in Detroit. Although the Gianola gang had fractured, two dominant figures within the Gianola organization emerged to take control of splinter factions of young mafiosi. Giuseppe Manzello, a Gianola gang gunman whose youth and ambition attracted younger members of the gang, rose to some prominence at the age of 20. Manzello's rise was met with opposition by the Renda/Mirabile family, who were the last remaining resistance within the old Gianola gang to the younger, more liberal members. The Renda/Mirabile family were more conservative and had more in common with Vitale and his faction.

On August 10, 1920, while Joe Manzello stood curbside talking to his close associates Angelo Meli, 23 and Angelo Polizzi, 21, a car sped by and showered the three men with bullets. Manzello was hit by eight bullets, Polizzi by seven. Meli escaped injury but Manzello and Polizzi were rushed to hospital. Polizzi eventually recovered; Manzello died days after the shooting as a result of his injuries. Manzello's followers demanded revenge on John Vitale who they felt had ordered the shooting.

Salvatore Catalanotte, known to his friends as "Singing Sam", was a Gianola gang lieutenant by the time he was 20. At the time of the Gianola-Vitale war, Catalanotte was the president of Detroit's Unione Siciliana. He became leader of a splinter group within the gang after the murder of his bosses. Catalanotte was a protégé of Gaetano Gianola. Catalanotte formed a strong alliance with Wyandotte area beer baron, Joseph Tocco and Hamtramck Mafia leader Chester La Mare. This faction became known as the Westside Mob.

The remaining Manzella group members were opposed to the Vitale leadership and on August 11, 1920, the group retaliated and struck back at Vitale by murdering Antonio Badalamenti, a leading Vitale gang member and the boss's nephew. The attack on Badalamenti in front of his grocery store was allegedly led by Joe Zerilli, the roommate and close associate of Manzella and Polizzi. Along with Zerilli, six other Manzella group members were arrested, including Zerilli's cousin Bill Tocco, Manzella's cousin Carlo Manzella, Leo Cellura, John Mangone, Vito Paraino, Joseph Delmonico and James Barraco. All the charges were dropped against them two days later.

The elimination of Joe Manzella left Sam Catalanotte as the dominant member of the old Gianola gang and as a sign of friendship he appointed Angelo Meli the leader of the Manzella group. Bill Tocco and Joe Zerilli were named as Meli's right-hand men. Meli reorganized the group under the "Eastside Mob" flag.

On August 18, 1920, police believed that several of those freed from being charged in the Badalamenti murder participated in the murder of Joe Vitale, the 17-year-old son of John Vitale. The killing may have been accidental with the true target was the senior Vitale, as gunmen directed a volley of bullets towards Vitale, his son and wife while they were leaving their home. Vitale was struck by 18 bullets fired from two moving cars at 3:00 am on October 2, 1920. No one was ever charged with his murder. The death of Vitale marked the end in the series of feuds. Relative peace reigned following his death and the ascension of Sam Catalanotte as the head of Detroit's Sicilian Mafia.

Catalanotte organized the remaining Mafia factions under a liquor combine that became known as the "Pascuzzi Combine". The combine was a liquor smuggling and bootlegging syndicate that gave each group and its leaders their own specific territory to operate, while working together for the overall expansion of Detroit Mafia power and influence. The Pascuzzi Combine created a unified and cohesive criminal organization that controlled liquor smuggling, bootlegging, gambling, prostitution, narcotics and other rackets and was the forerunner of the Detroit Partnership under the future Zerilli-Tocco regime.

Prohibition era
Throughout the Prohibition era, from 1920 to 1933, the Detroit River was utilized to facilitate the flow of illegal liquor from Canada to Detroit. The bootleggers who did this were referred to as rum runners. These bootleggers also owned the majority of the speed boats in the river. Detroit had a dedicated fleet of patrol boats to prevent the transportation of liquor across the border. However, this system was ineffective because federal officers were caught taking bribes. Towards the end of Prohibition, the gangs began upgrading to larger boats able to manage heavy seas and carry more liquor, and added larger motors to enable higher workload and maintain their schedule. Detroit continued to add more of a police presence but the rum runners were able to go around the checkpoints.

In the late 1920s, following the 18th Amendment to the United States Constitution, the Detroit Partnership capitalized on new transportation mediums in order to conduct their illicit activities. They were aided by Detroit's proximity to the Canadian border and neighboring city of Windsor, Ontario, with the province not having a ban on the production and exportation of alcohol.

Until the late 1920s, goods and civilians crossed the Detroit-Windsor border via ferry, as there was no bridge. The automotive industry within Detroit encouraged immigrants from Canada to seek work in the United States, which in turn invited bootleggers to shuffle their illicit goods through large crowds of immigrants. Initial plans and blueprints to build the Ambassador Bridge and Detroit-Windsor Tunnel found public support as Detroiters became upset with the apparent lack of infrastructure. By the time the Bridge and Tunnel were built in 1929 and 1930, respectively, the liquor trade was under the purview of the state and provincial governments. The city of Windsor and Detroit-Tunnel were consequently nicknamed "Windsor the Wicked" and "Detroit-Windsor Funnel" due to a negative reputation from illegal liquor trading.

Boss "Singing Sam" Catalanotte (1921–1930)
The Detroit Mafia as a unified organization can be traced to the early 20th century "Motor City" mafiosi who came together to begin what was known by the early 1930s as the Detroit crime family or Detroit Partnership. Gaspar Milazzo was born in 1887 in Castellammare del Golfo, Sicily. Milazzo, known as "The Peacemaker", and Stefano Magaddino, known as "The Undertaker", were two of the earliest Castellammarese Clan leaders to settle in the Brooklyn area. Their crew faced opposition from Buccellato clan who had also settled there and were involved within the Italian underworld. Continued violence between the two groups caused Milazzo and Magaddino to flee New York City in 1921 after they were sought for questioning in connection with the murder of a Buccellato clan member. Magaddino fled to Buffalo, New York, and Milazzo to Detroit, where both used their high level positions within the "Castellammarese Mafia" to organize their own crime families. The relocation of Milazzo and Magaddino and their establishment of powerful East coast Mafia families played a role in the eventual unification of the American Mafia, known to its members as La Cosa Nostra or "This Thing of Ours".

Milazzo established himself as a powerful mobster within the Detroit underworld. Detroit had a large Sicilian immigrant population and was one of the East Coast's bootlegging hubs. At the time of Milazzo's arrival the Jewish Purple Gang controlled much of the liquor trafficking in the area. Milazzo became recognized as a Mafia adviser and mediator of disputes as many of the areas mafiosi sought his council and leadership. Milazzo aligned himself with Salvatore Catalanotte, known as "Singing Sam", the local head of the Unione Siciliana. Milazzo and Catalanotte aligned the city's Mafia factions into a loosely organized and cohesive unit that controlled bootlegging, gambling, narcotics, prostitution and other rackets within the city and surrounding areas.

Catalanotte had brokered an uneasy peace under the "Pascuzzi Combine" around 1920. Milazzo assisted Catalanotte with the continued unification and leadership and after Catalanotte's death in February 1930, Milazzo continued to oversee the peace between the local Mafia factions. Milazzo was then recognized as the senior Mafia leader in the area and the boss of the local Mafia for a short time. Milazzo was a close associate of the East Side Gang, led by Angelo Meli, William Tocco and Joseph Zerilli. Milazzo's Mafia group and the Eastside Gang maintained alliances with other mob factions, including the River Gang, led by brothers Thomas and Peter Licavoli who shared the local bootlegging rackets and various underworld activities with each other.

The Crosstown Mafia War (1930-1931)
Milazzo had been recognized as one of the Detroit Mafia's top bosses since the early 1920s and relative stability had reigned within the local underworld throughout this time, but by 1930 continuing Mafia rivalries based in New York and Chicago concerning his Castellammarese allies directly involved Milazzo. At the heart of the volatile situation within New York City's Mafia lay Milazzo's fellow Castellammarese mafiosi who found themselves being opposed by powerful boss Giuseppe "Joe the Boss" Masseria. The ongoing feud had reached a boiling point and supporters on both sides in New York, as well as Chicago were preparing for war.

Gaspar Milazzo and his longtime ally, Buffalo Mafia boss Stefano Magaddino had secretly, but willingly supported their allies in New York and Chicago as they opposed Joe Masseria and his supporters. By 1930, both men openly supported their allies, including Chicago Mafia boss Giuseppe Aiello, who was being opposed by a powerful Masseria ally in Chicago, Al Capone. Joe Masseria, the recognized "boss of bosses" was incensed by the disrespect Milazzo and Magaddino where showing him by supporting his enemies and soon Masseria decided Milazzo and Magaddino, both powerful and influential mafiosi, must be eliminated.

Masseria accomplished this in Detroit by supporting a Milazzo adversary, Cesare "Chester" William LaMare, the now head of the Westside Mob, sometimes referred to as the Catalanotte Gang in Detroit. LaMare was born in Ripacandida, Italy on January 6, 1887, to two parents of Italian descent. LaMare later established himself as a naturalized U.S. citizen and in 1917, proclaimed his occupation to be a self-employed fruit merchant in Detroit. LaMare's parents were allegedly of Castellammarese descent and some Mafia historians claim he was a close associate of Milazzo. In the early 1920s, LaMare established a base of operations in Hamtramck. He opened a popular night club known as the Venice Cafe. With his business partners and the leaders of the Eastside Gang, Angelo Meli, William Vito "Black Bill" Tocco, and Joseph "Joe Uno" Zerilli, LaMare grew rich and powerful, shaking down brothels and gambling houses for protection and muscling into bootlegging rackets. Hamtramck became so corrupt that in the fall of 1923, Michigan Governor Alex Groesbeck ordered detachments of the Michigan State Police into Hamtramck to take control of the city government. This operation resulted in the arrest and eventual conviction of 31 men, including Hamtramck Mayor Peter C. Jezewski, for Prohibition law violations. LaMare was sentenced to a year in federal prison, but the judge increased his original fines and gave him probation on LaMare's promise to "go straight".

In early February 1930, Sam Catalanotte died from pneumonia. The situation was exactly what LaMare had been waiting for. LaMare had previously been the principal lieutenant of Sam Giannola and believed he should have been elevated to Catalanotte's position of supreme boss by the end of the Giannola-Vitale War.

Following the death of Sam Catalanotte and with the support of Joe Masseria in New York, LaMare began to make plans to eliminate the leaders of the Eastside gang which included Angelo Meli, William Tocco and Joseph Zerilli. LaMare's Westside gang consisted of mostly members from the old Sam Catalanotte gang, a downriver gang headed by William Tocco's brother, Joseph Tocco, and Benny Vitagliano (Benny the Baker). There had been an ongoing rivalry between the Eastside and Westside gangs formed as LaMare forced his way into the Eastside gang's rackets. LaMare's aggressive ventures into the Eastside gang had almost brought about open warfare in the Detroit Italian underworld. LaMare used the potential warfare as an excuse to set up an assassination attempt disguised as a peace meeting. LaMare scheduled a meeting between the two divisions of Detroit at a Vernor Highway fish market, where he planned for three gunman to assassinate Eastside mob bosses.

The Fish Market Murders developed into the major gang conflict between the Eastside and Westside Mobs, which would later be known as the Crosstown Mafia War. Meli immediately swore to avenge the deaths of his two representatives. Between May 31 and July 23, 1930, at least 14 men were murdered by gangland guns.

The killings stopped abruptly with the murder of WNBC radio commentator Gerald Buckley on July 23, who was shot in the lobby of the LaSalle Hotel on the same night that the vote to recall Detroit Mayor Charles Bowles took place.
 
In response to the killing, The Detroit police enacted severe measures to restrict undesirable and illegal crime, as they tried to find persons of interest after Buckley's murder. The Detroit Police put a grand jury into place immediately to investigate the crimes that were happening. Most mob leaders went into hiding, while gangs maintained a much lower profile as the war continued. The police and the Eastside Mob were looking everywhere for Meli. Police speculated that Meli told Joe Amico and the other assassins from the fish market that they needed to put their boss, LaMare, "on the spot," soon or they would end up dead. On February 6, 1931, LaMare arrived at his home with his bodyguard, Joe Girardi. LaMare asked his wife to drive Girardi home. Two men entered the house, who was later identified by fingerprints as Joe Amico and Elmer Macklinand, shot LaMare twice in the side of his head. Chester was found dead in the kitchen several hours later by his wife.

LaMare's death successfully ended the Crosstown Mafia War in 1931. Amico and Macklin were later tried and acquitted for the murder of LaMare. Leaders of the Eastside Mob became the originators of what was to become Detroit's modern-day Mafia organization.

Establishment of the Detroit Partnership

Castellammarese War
After the death of Gaspar Milazzo a war ignited within the Detroit Mafia and at the same time the Castellammarese War in New York had officially begun. During this time in Detroit Chester La Mare, with the support of powerful New York boss Joe Masseria was recognized as the new Detroit Mafia boss.

La Mare went into hiding while more than a dozen Mafia members were killed in Detroit during the Eastside gang/Westside gang war that lasted roughly a year. In February 1931, La Mare was having a meal with his bodyguards, Joe Amico and Elmer Macklin, when he was murdered. While Amico spoke to La Mare, Macklin rose to wash some dishes and subsequently shot his boss in the back. Both Amico and Macklin had a murky history with previous their previous operations, being described as "not too well trusted even by the gangland [they] served." La Mare's wife was not present at the time of the murder, as she was driving one of her husband's associates back to his home in Detroit. Some theorized that Mrs. La Mare was informed of or even involved in her husband's murder, given the unique circumstances of her absence that night. Eventually, these rumors dissipated. Betrayed by his own men in his home, La Mare and his authority were swiftly put to an end. The death of La Mare in early 1931 and other Mafia leaders later on, such as Joe Tocco, led to the remaining Detroit Mafia leaders uniting under one group and leadership: that of the reigning Eastside gang leaders, Angelo Meli, "Black" Bill Tocco and Joe Uno Zerilli.

Alongside Meli, Tocco and Zerilli were their allies John Priziola and Peter Licavoli who become part of the Detroit Partnership's "Ruling Council", the crime family's top leadership committee. This was basically the formation of the Detroit crime family or Detroit Partnership as it became known within the American underworld. At the same time Detroit's Mafia factions were in opposition of each other once more throughout 1931, the Castellammarese War raged on within New York's Italian underworld pitting the city's two most powerful, old world Sicilian bosses and their supporters against each other.

The assassination of New York Mafia "boss of bosses", Joe Masseria on April 15, 1931, effectively ended the large scale Mafia war based in New York. 
The next round of events in New York's Italian underworld would influence not only Detroit's underworld future, but basically that of the American underworld. Soon after the death of Joe Masseria his main rival and successor, Salvatore Maranzano was murdered on September 10, 1931, by a rising faction of young Mafia leaders within the New York Mafia. These young, modern Mafia leaders had helped Maranzano eliminate Masseria, but all the while they were biding their time and planning their eventual take over of the New York underworld and consolidation of the Italian underworld nationwide.

The death of New York's two old world-style Mafia leaders, Masseria and Maranzano signaled and solidified the rise of a young, modern Mafia leader, Charles "Lucky" Luciano and his supporters known as the "young turks". Under the leadership of Luciano and the allied leaders within New York's Five Families came the establishment of The Commission, the ruling committee of the American Mafia. Under the New York Mafia's new regime, which included bosses Charlie Lucky Luciano, Joseph "Joe Bananas" Bonanno, Vince Mangano, Thomas Gagliano and Joseph Profaci, the Detroit Partnership was officially recognized within the Italian-American underworld's new organizational structure. 
The powerful mid-west crime family became one of the 24 original Mafia crime families that comprised La Cosa Nostra in America and began its dominance within the Michigan underworld.

Zerilli era (1936–1977)

The first official or "sitting boss" of the Detroit Partnership was William Tocco, born Guglielmo Vito Tocco in Terrasina, Sicily, in 1897 and known as "Black Bill" Tocco. Tocco had been one of the top leaders of the Eastside gang, along with Joseph Zerilli and Angelo Meli who became underboss and consigliere to Tocco. 
Tocco's reign as the supreme ruler of the Detroit Mafia lasted roughly five years as he was indicted on tax evasion charges in March 1936. Even though the financial portion of the case was settled in 1937 Tocco stepped down as boss soon after his indictment due to the publicity, something that early, traditional American Mafia bosses shunned.

Tocco was convicted and sentenced to eight years in prison and was replaced by his trusted underboss and brother-in-law, Joseph Zerilli, who then headed the Ruling Panel' of the Detroit Partnership. Some Detroit underworld historians and mob watchers believe that Black Bill Tocco served as the number two man or underboss for his brother-in-law Joe Zerilli from the time of his imprisonment until his semi-retirement in the mid-1960s.

Upon his release from prison in the mid-1940s Tocco moved to Florida, but without question maintained a great deal of power within the Detroit underworld and his influential status within the Detroit Partnership. While living in semi-retirement in Miami, Bill Tocco remained a senior adviser to boss Joe Zerilli and his fellow mafiosi in Detroit and was considered a respected Mafia leader by his peers across the country until his death of natural causes on May 28, 1972, at the age of 75.

After a 1956 Commission meeting, the crime families of Philadelphia, headed by Angelo Bruno, and Detroit, headed by Zerilli, were added to The Commission. As a commission member Zerilli acted as a senior L.C.N. leader alongside the five New York City bosses and other top Mafia bosses from around the country at the time that included Stefano Magaddino of Buffalo, Sam Giancana of Chicago, Angelo Bruno of Philadelphia, Santo Trafficante Jr. of Tampa, Carlos Marcello of New Orleans and Raymond Patriarca Sr. of New England. Joe Zerilli remained the top boss of the Detroit Mafia until his death of natural causes on October 30, 1977, at the age of 79.

Anthony Joseph Zerilli had taken over as acting boss of the Detroit Partnership around 1970 when the elder Zerilli went into semi-retirement, but it was short-lived, as "the old man", as he was known to his peers in his later years, was called out of retirement until his death to lead the crime family he helped build over the better part of five decades due to the untimely imprisonment of his son and successor in 1974.

With the imprisonment of the younger Zerilli and one of his closest associates, Michael Santo Polizzi, known as "Big Mike" because they had concealed their ownership of the Frontier Hotel and Casino in Las Vegas, the old man was basically forced out of retirement to lead the crime family at the highest levels once more until a suitable successor could be chosen.

Anthony Giacalone gained national fame in the 1970s with the disappearance of Jimmy Hoffa. Prior to then, there had been growing tension between Hoffa and several Mafia members, who opposed his plans to return to prominence in the International Brotherhood of Teamsters. The latter included Giacalone, Anthony Provenzano and Giacalone's brother Vito. On July 30, 1975, Hoffa disappeared after he had gone out to a restaurant to meet Provenzano and Giacalone. Giacalone had not been near the restaurant that afternoon, though he was suspected of being involved in a conspiracy to murder Hoffa. Giacalone was later jailed for 10 years in 1976 for income tax fraud at FCI, Oxford, Wisconsin.

Gotham Hotel 
From its construction in 1924 until the early 1940s, the hotel was named the Hotel Martinique. However, not enough hotels that catered to the black community during this time. In 1943 John White, Walter Norwood, and Irving Roane purchased the hotel with the hopes of making it an oasis for the black community in Detroit. The Gotham Hotel became the most renowned hotel for black people in Detroit and regularly hosted popular celebrities and athletes, such as Langston Hughes and Jackie Robinson.

The hotel's clientele included black businessmen, gamblers, and mafia affiliated cronies including Anthony Giacalone and Pete Licavoli. Giacalone was a Detroit mafia gambling boss who teamed up with Licavoli to manage the gambling/illegal rackets at the hotel.

In 1962, a gambling racket run inside the building formerly occupied by the Gotham Hotel was raided by the Michigan State Police, aided by the IRS and local authorities. Security at the hotel was tightly controlled by the use of a "building-wide buzzer alarm system" and an extensive camera system that linked to a television in the lobby. All authorities involved handled the case with complete secrecy when investigating the hotel, and at 5:00 pm on November 9, 1962, 112 officers, led by Anthony Getto of the IRS’ intelligence division, raided the hotel. Upon trying to use the elevators, they found that the power to them was cut, and officers had to use the stairs to reach all nine stories and 250 rooms of the hotel. On the top floor, a crooked dice game was found with $5,000 on the table. On the other nine floors, bet slips, adding machines, counting machines, guns, ammunition, and at least 30 safes were found. The next day, the safes were cracked to find a grand total of $49,200 in the safes alone. The raid amounted to 160,000 bet slips, $60,000 in cash, and 33 adding machines.

Forty one arrests were made in the raid. Nine people were held in federal custody and arraigned the next day on charges for not having a gambling stamp and evading taxes. Also in federal custody were John White, Earle Cuzzens, Benjamin Ormsby, Curtis Lewis, James Cummings, James Gholston, Nick Richardson, Delores Stone, and Dorothy Grier. Those caught playing dice on the tenth floor were placed under investigation for violating Michigan gambling laws. White and Cuzzens were released on $10,000 bond. The other individuals found in the dice game were tried on charges for gambling or conspiracy.

The raid on the Gotham hotel meant gambling location could no longer presume on immunity in Detroit. Many operators moved their gambling operations outside of the city, while operators that stayed were continually on the move. This made policing easier because there were more opportunities to observe them and catch their mistakes. The phone numbers of Giacalone and Licavoli appeared in the personal phone directory of White confiscated during the raid, evidence, the police used to confirm the longstanding belief that operators at the Gotham were connected to the Detroit Syndicate.

The American Lebanese Club 

This section is on the American Lebanese Club, which was a mafia-run gambling establishment fronted as a "social fellowship" organization. The American Lebanese Club eventually became the Lower East Side of Detroit Club, abbreviated to Lesod Club. Members of the Lesod Club played Barbut, a dice game of Middle Eastern origin. The Lesod Club, operated by Anthony and Vito Giacolone, moved locations a number of times throughout its existence due to police-generated pressure. Police had regular surveillance on the Lesod club and raided it many times, attempting to uncover the illegal gambling that was carefully hidden under the facade of a social club, until its closure in 1962.

The American-Lebanese Club was first raided by police in 1942 for gambling suspicions. From 1942 until early 1959, it was raided 18 times and 275 people were arrested, yet none of them had been charged. Police were unable to bring about a court case due to insufficient evidence—that is until Asab Jordan went to the police after amassing a $5,000 debt gambling at the club.

After this event, the police set up a 24-hour surveillance sting operation in October 1959 to track which members were visiting the club. They installed lights in the area and took pictures of various members to arrest in the future. There were reports that members were so fed up with the surveillance that they started taking pictures of the police officers that were watching the club.

On December 29, 1959, the police made their largest raid on the club, arresting 28 members, later bringing 11 members to trial. The police suspected that Vito Giacolone, an underboss of the Partnership, and Michael Thomas ran the gambling operations of the club, which could bring in $10,000 in a typical weekend. Asab Jordan was the star witness in the case, but police almost lost his testimony when he failed at attempting suicide, which he says was unrelated to the case, but more so related to pressures to pay his debts.

Over the following months, others were arrested in relation to the gambling charges, with individuals being identified by the pictures the police took over several months. The people arrested after the raid were never charged, while the 11 people awaiting trial pleaded guilty and were facing two years in prison. Ultimately, the 11 members were assessed fines ranging from $100-$300, with Vito Giacolone receiving the highest fine of $300.

After the constant surveillance and resulting court cases, the American-Lebanese Club stopped operating and became the Lower East Side of Detroit (LESOD) Club.

The Lower East Side of Detroit (LESOD) Club 
When the American-Lebanese Club was shut down in 1959, the Lesod Club, originally Lower East Side of Detroit Club, took its place at 106 W Columbia St. and later moved to River Rouge. The Lesod club was much like the American-Lebanese Club. Registered as a men's social club, the Lesod club ran an illegal barbudi game that could rake in $30,000 in one night. The club was run by two mafiosi, Vito and Anthony Giacalone. Adding onto the security measures put in place when it was the American-Lebanese Club, the Giacalone brothers developed extremely cautious systems to protect the club against police.

The game was played upstairs behind a locked door with a peephole. The outside was guarded who screened people before they were allowed to enter through the locked door downstairs. There was a while where Billy Giacalone and his henchmen, Otis Tincer, who were both involved in security, let police upstairs to look around. Unfortunately for the police, all they would find after hearing people rushing around upstairs, was men playing checkers.

Eventually, the police filed a petition for abatement of a nuisance and they subpoenaed everyone who entered the club in the nights that followed. All of the witnesses pleaded the fifth amendment, however, the police already had enough evidence for a search warrant. Before the search warrant could be exercised, the Lesod Club closed and did not try to reopen in the city of Detroit. Despite not reopening in the city, Vito attempted several times to move the gambling operation to the suburbs.

Tocco era (1977-1996)

Upon his death in 1977, Joe Zerilli was succeeded as boss by the most senior member of the Ruling Council, John Priziola, known affectionately to his peers as "Papa John". Born Giovanni Priziola, the longtime Detroit Mafia leader was one of only two charter ruling council members left alive and active at the time of Zerilli's death. 
The other senior ruling council member was former Down River Gang leader and Prohibition era czar, Peter Licavoli, who by this time was himself semi-retired and living in Tucson, Arizona, not far from his friend, retired Mafia boss Joe Bonanno.

Licavoli was a powerful Detroit Partnership member who had been the crime family's Toledo, Ohio, operations overseer and held a great deal of influence over Detroit area gambling operations, along with many other personal business interests.

Pete Licavoli ran his business affairs from his Arizona ranch which he then sold to Estes Homes for development in 1980. He died of natural causes on January 11, 1984, at the age of 81, the last of the original ruling council members. With the death of boss Joe Zerilli, John Priziola as the Detroit Partnership's most senior leader effectively became the top boss of the crime family. Only Peter Licavoli held the same status and a similar level of authority as a charter ruling council member. Priziola had been a longtime Detroit Mafia leader who was greatly respected throughout the Detroit Mafia, but much of his power came from being the leader of a powerful and wealthy faction within the Detroit Partnership.

The "Partinico faction" was a group of Detroit Mafia leaders that included Raffaele Quasarano and deported Sicilian-American mafiosi, Francesco "Frankie Fingers" Coppola. These men, along with associates in San Diego, California, and Windsor, Ontario, ran the crime family's heroin importation operations. Through their influential underworld connections nationwide they amassed a great deal of wealth and power over the years with the help of their narcotics contacts in Sicily.

Priziola was a traditional, old world mafioso who ran his affairs and those of the crime family from the shadows, so to run the day-to-day operations he officially named Joe Zerilli's nephew and Bill Tocco's son, Giacomo "Jack" Tocco as the acting boss of the crime family. Papa John acted as the crime family's official consigliere, but due to his senior position and the great deal of power and influence Priziola carried throughout the Detroit Partnership his word was final. 
The long criminal career of Papa John Priziola within Detroit's underworld was influential, but his time as the top boss in Detroit was short-lived, as he died of natural causes at the age of 84 on April 14, 1979, less than two years after his predecessor, Joe Zerilli.

Joe Zerilli had demoted his son and chosen successor Tony as acting boss after he was convicted in the early 1970s and allegedly before his death Zerilli gave his blessing and encouraged his supporters to name his nephew and protégé, Jack Tocco as his eventual successor to the throne of the Detroit crime family. Jack Tocco's intelligence and abilities as a leader were known within the Detroit underworld during the time the young Tocco made his way through the ranks of the Detroit Partnership in the 1950s and 60s. The fact that Tocco basically held a "mafia pedigree" and was considered "mafia royalty" as the son of Black Bill Tocco worked greatly to his advantage and he was eventually named the new sitting boss of the Detroit crime family soon after the death of Papa John Priziola.

According to law enforcement sources Jack Tocco allegedly became the official boss of the Detroit Partnership on June 11, 1979, in a ceremony held at the Timberland Game Ranch in Dexter Township. Apparently as a sign of appreciation for the support his father gave him and to show that they were united as a family Jack Tocco named his cousin Tony Zerilli his official underboss immediately after he was released from prison in 1979 after serving over four years of his prison sentence.

According to law enforcement, Mafia historians and true crime authors the Tocco-Zerilli regime still maintains its leadership within the Detroit Mafia, known in local underworld and law enforcement circles to this day as the "Partnership" and the "Combination".

The Partnership since 1996

The Partnership was hit by indictments in March 1996 against 17 members and associates. Among those indicted were boss Jack Tocco and underboss Anthony Joseph Zerilli. Four alleged capos were also indicted. One was Anthony Joseph Corrado, who was identified in 1974 by the Nevada Gaming Commission as one of a few individuals from Detroit who received "lavish" treatment while vacationing at the Las Vegas casinos.

Anthony Joseph Tocco was another reputed capo. He was among 30 Detroit men placed on the record of the Senate Labor-Management Rackets Committee by Robert F. Kennedy who claimed that Tocco either was a delegate to a crime convention in Apalachin, New York, or among "their contacts and associates." Vito William Giacalone is a reputed capo along with his brother Anthony.

The Detroit Partnership has been able to remain stable entering the 21st century, but the organization has been diminished greatly in numbers. It was believed to have around 50-70 made men , but at the same time the organization has proven itself to be a very stable and resilient crime family considering what most other Cosa Nostra families deal with in the way of internal strife and law enforcement scrutiny. The Detroit Partnership has remained stable and is still considered a top criminal organization within the state of Michigan. Most of their members are related by blood or marriage making it hard for outsiders, including law enforcement, to gain information on them. This has led to few people becoming informants against the Partnership and has made building a criminal investigation against them difficult.

On June 19, 2001, 34-year old John Jarjosa Jr. was shot and killed in Southfield, Michigan, on the 8 Mile Road. Detroit mob associate 31-year old Gerard "Jerry the Blade" Bianchette was murdered at a Macomb County construction site by a shotgun blast on August 10, 2002. Bianchette was considered a protégé of Anthony Joseph Zerilli and his murder is believed to be stemmed from a drug-deal that Bianchette felt Louis "Butch" Stramaglia owed him money from.

A large number of associates oversee gambling, loansharking, extortion, narcotics and labor racketeering operations, along with many legitimate businesses. Jack Tocco, having been semi-retired for years, died of natural causes in 2014. Jackie Giacalone, who had been groomed to take over for years, became boss before Tocco's death. Joseph Mirabile took over as underboss, but peacefully seceded the position to Anthony La Piana upon Giacalone's ascension to boss.

As of 2011, it is believed that membership in the Detroit Partnership stands at around 50 made members.

Historical leadership

Boss (official and acting)
1890s–1913 – Pietro Mirabile – stepped down, later fled Detroit in 1914.
1913 — Vito Adamo — murdered on November 24, 1913.
1913-1919 — Antonio "Tony" Gianola — murdered on January 3, 1919.
1919 — Salvatore "Sam" Gianola — murdered on October 2, 1919.
1919-1921 — Giovanni "John" Vitale — murdered on September 28, 1921.
1921-1930 — Salvatore "Singing Sam" Catalanotte — died on February 14, 1930.
1930 — Gaspar "The Peacemaker" Milazzo — murdered on June 1, 1930.
1930-1931 — Cesare Lamare — murdered on February 7, 1931.
1931-1936 — Guglielmo "Black Bill" Tocco — stepped down in March 1936, becoming underboss.
1936-1977 — Joseph "The Old Man" Zerilli
Acting 1970-1974 — Anthony "Tony Z." Zerilli — imprisoned in 1974.
Acting 1974-1977 — Giacomo "Jack" Tocco
1977-1979 — Giovanni "Papa John" Priziola 
1979–2014 — Giacomo "Jack" Tocco — semi-retired in 2014. Died July 14, 2014.
Acting 1998-2002: Tony Tocco
2014–present — Jack "Jackie the Kid" Giacalone

Street boss (front boss)
1950s-2001 — Anthony "Tony Jack" Giacalone
2002–2014 — Jack "Jackie The Kid" Giacalone — became boss in 2014. 
2014–present — Peter "Blackie" Tocco

Underboss (official and acting)
1936-1963 — Guglielmo "Black Bill" Tocco
1963-1972 — Peter Licavoli — imprisoned in 1972.
1972-1977 — Peter "Bozzi" Vitale — stepped down in 1977.
1977-2008 — Anthony "Tony Z." Zerilli – demoted, then shelved
Acting 2002-2008 — Vito "Billy Jack" Giacalone
2008–2014 — Joseph "Joe Hooks" Mirabile — retired in 2014.
2014–present — Anthony "Chicago Tony" La Piana

Consigliere
1931-1969 — Angelo Meli
1969-1977 — Giovanni "Papa John" Priziola — became boss in 1977.
1977-1981 — Raffael "Jimmy Q." Quasarano - imprisoned in 1981.
1981-1993 — Michael Santo "Big Mike" Polizzi
1993-2008 — Anthony "Tony T." Tocco
2008–2014 — Dominic "Uncle Dom" Bommarito — retired in 2014.
2014–2019 — Anthony "Tony Pal" Palazzolo. Died January 2019.

Current family members

Administration
Boss — Jack "Jackie the Kid" Giacalone
Street Boss — Peter "Specs" Tocco
Underboss — Anthony "Chicago Tony" LaPiana
Consigliere — Unknown

Capos
 Joseph "Joey Jack" Giacalone
 Joseph "Joe the Hood" D'Anna
 David "Davey the Doughnut" Aceto
 (Acting) Paul "Big Paulie" Corrado (possibly inactive?)

Informants/witnesses

Nove Tocco - he is the first made member of the Detroit crime family to cooperate. He held the rank of soldier. During the late 1990s, Tocco was convicted of several offenses so he testified against Jack Tocco in 2000 to receive a lighter sentence. He is currently in the witness protection program.

See also
The Purple Gang
The Flathead gang
Paul Jaworski - boss of Flathead gang

References
Notes

Sources
 Kelly, Robert J. Encyclopedia of Organized Crime in the United States. Westport, Connecticut: Greenwood Press, 2000. 
 Sifakis, Carl. The Mafia Encyclopedia. New York: Da Capo Press, 2005. 
 Sifakis, Carl. The Encyclopedia of American Crime. New York: Facts on File Inc., 2001. 
 Dan E. Moldea, The Hoffa Wars, Charter Books, New York: 1978 
 Charles Brandt, I Heard You Paint Houses: Frank "the Irishman" Sheeran and the inside story of the Mafia, the Teamsters, and the last ride of Jimmy Hoffa, Steerforth Press, Hanover (NH, USA) 2004.
 Burnstein, Scott M. Motor City Mafia  
 

 

 
Organizations established in 1908
1908 establishments in Michigan
Organizations based in Detroit
Italian-American crime families
Gangs in Detroit
Italian-American culture in Michigan